Benningbroek is a village in the northwest Netherlands. It is located in the municipality of Medemblik, North Holland about 40 km north of Amsterdam. On the western side, Benningbroek has merged with Sijbekarspel.

The village was first mentioned around 1338 as Bennenbroech, and means "swampy land of the people of Benne (person)". Bennebroek developed in the 11th century as a peat excavation settlement.

The Dutch Reformed church is a single aisled church with a tall spire from the 16th century. The choir was demolished at the end of the 18th century.

Benningbroek was home to 461 people in 1840. In 1887, a joint railway station with Sijbekarspel opened on the Hoorn to Medemblik railway line. The line closed in 1941.

Gallery

References

Populated places in North Holland
Medemblik